Udumban is a 2012 Indian Tamil-language action drama film directed by Ramji S. Balan (who previously directed Nagareega Komali) and starring Dilip Rogger, Sana, Keethika, and G. Sunil.

Cast 
Dilip Rogger as Udumban
Sana as Isaipriya, a PhD student researching education
Keethika as a saree thief, who is engaged to Udumban
G. Sunil as Kaalai, Udumban's elder brother who is allergic to lizard meat
Senthil as Maari, Udumban's friend
Chellakuri as Inspector Courtallam
Kambam Meena as Udumban's mother
Paravai Muniyamma (special appearance in the song "Ange Idi Muzhangathu")

Production and release 
Bike racer Dilip Rogger debuted as an actor with this film and trained for six months for the role. Rogger's character was based on Paruthi Vooran from Paruthi-Oor (previously depicted in Paruthiveeran), who actually existed according to the director. The film was shot in the same locations where Paruthi Vooran lived. A monitor lizard (udumbu in Tamil) plays a prominent role in the film. Malayalam actress Radhika (who starred in Classmates)  was cast opposite Rogger in the role of a researcher and Kerala model Nachathra as the second heroine, and they were rechristened as Sana and Keethika, respectively. The film was shot in the interior villages of Madurai and Karaikudi, and was shot for three years because when it rained the land would get wet and not look authentic. The famous folk song "Ange Idi Muzhangudhu" took eight days to shoot instead of five because of the intervention by religious villagers.

The film was scheduled to release on 10 February, but ran into trouble as wildlife enthusiast P. Selvaraj sought to ban the film for violence against monitor lizards, which is an endangered species. Rogger claimed that the monitor lizard was only present during the first photoshoot and appeared in the film through the use of graphics. Although a court hearing was scheduled on 16 February, the film released on 17 February. Producer Jeganathan obtained permission from forest officials before shooting with the monitor lizard. Jeganathan filed a ₹1 crore defamation suit against Selvaraj.

Soundtrack 
The soundtrack album was composed by Ramji S. Balan. The album features five songs that were written by Bharathidasan and two written by Pattukottai Kalyanasundaram, and includes "Ange Idi Muzhangathu", which is dedicated to Karuppasamy.
"Ange Idi Muzhangathu" sung by Thekkampatti Sundarrajan and Paravai Muniyamma
"Kaattrilellam" sung by Hariharan and Sadhana Sargam
"Pallikoodam Muthal Mani" sung by Anuradha Sriram and Hariharan
"Vaanukku Nilavu" sung by Shankar Mahadevan
"Kandavudan Kaathal" sung by Hariharan
"Paazhaai Pona Manam" sung by Shankar Mahadevan and Priya
"Nallarukkum Pollarukkum" sung by Mukesh
"Oram Kizhinjalum" sung by Mukesh

Reception 
Malathi Rangarajan of The Hindu opined that "But isn't neat execution even more important [than a strong storyline] to make the film worth your while? It is in this area that Udumban falls terribly short". Siddharth Varma of The Times of India stated that "The storyline is a little confusing as it tries to incorporate too many things – sibling rivalry, the rich becoming richer, police corruption, the plight of farmers and, yes, the education system too. Ultimately, it falls victim to the many flaws it wants to highlight". A critic from The New Indian Express wrote that "But what is consistent and holds up the film to a large extent, is the line of humour and satire that runs throughout. ‘Udumban’ delivers much more that what one expected". A critic from Sify said that "On the whole, the film is well-intentioned,  and criticizes the flaws of our education system and how anybody can start a school with prime focus on minting money in an entertaining manner. It addresses the topical issue about the challenge that parents go through to get their kids admitted to private schools". A critic from Behindwoods wrote that "Although the movie has a good message to deliver, despite the fact that the message is increasingly being delivered repeatedly in recent times, slapdash production values bring the cause down. However, it is commendable that director Balan attempted a social satire with his first movie with a valuable catch on our education system". A critic from Dinamalar praised several aspects of the film including the performance of the cast, the music, the lyrics, the cinematography, the editing, but criticised the storyline of the second half of the film. A critic from Filmibeat praised the film for highlighting what needs to be changed about education while also praising the cinematography, editing, and music.

Box office 
The film had a below average opening at the Chennai box office.

References

Notes 

2010s Tamil-language films
Indian action drama films